Florian Baucke, also Florian Paucke, Florian Pauke,  (24 September 1719, Winzig, Silesia/Bohemian Royal Lands, (15261742) Habsburg monarchy (Austria)  14 July 1779, Neuhaus, Bohemia, Austria) was a Silesian and Bohemian Jesuit missionary, who recorded the native traditions of South America.

Baucke was born in Winzig, Austrian Silesia.

In 1736, he became a member of the Society of Jesus (Jesuite).

He worked mainly in the Río de la Plata, Imperial Spain, and drew and painted the customs of the region.

He returned to Austria and Bohemia in 1768.
He died, aged 59, in Neuhaus, Bohemia.

His original manuscripts are in the Library of the Zwettl Abbey, Zwettl, Lower Austria.

Bibliography 
 Andreas Kobler (1816–92): Pater Florian Baucke ein Jesuit in Paraguay. 1870
 Augustin Bringmann: Pater Florian Baucke, ein deutscher Missionär in Paraguay. 1908

References 

1719 births
1779 deaths
18th-century Austrian Jesuits
Czech Jesuits
18th-century explorers
18th-century Bohemian people
18th-century Spanish writers
18th-century male writers
18th-century Argentine people
Austrian expatriates in Spain
Czech expatriates in Spain
Austrian expatriates in Argentina
People from Austrian Silesia
German Bohemian people
German emigrants to the Austrian Empire
People from Wołów County
People from Jindřichův Hradec